New Craigs Psychiatric Hospital is a hospital situated in Leachkin, on the western outskirts of Inverness, Scotland. It is managed by NHS Highland.

History
The facility is a 234-bed healthcare campus that provides mental health and learning disability accommodation. New Craigs, which replaced Craig Dunain Hospital and Craig Phadrig Hospital both of which were both located nearby, opened in July 2000.

The hospital was the first psychiatric facility to be funded under a private finance initiative scheme in Scotland. It was built and managed by Robertson Group, with NHS Highland repaying for the cost over a 25-year contract. Under the PFI arrangement the facility cost £16.5 million to build but the total cost that NHS Highland is expected to bear is estimated at £106 million.

References

Hospital buildings completed in 2000
Psychiatric hospitals in Scotland
Hospitals in Highland (council area)
Buildings and structures in Inverness
Hospitals established in 2000
2000 establishments in Scotland
NHS Scotland hospitals